An assembly ship (also known as a formation ship or Judas goat) was a Boeing B-17 Flying Fortress or Consolidated B-24 Liberator bomber (usually an older model) that was stripped down of its armaments and given extra flares, navigational equipment, and unique distinctive paint scheme in order to organize combat box formations more quickly.

History

Due to the threat of fighters to US Army Air Force bombers during daylight raids, tight bomber formations began to be employed in order to maximize defensive firepower and to concentrate bombs on the designated target.  However, these formations required time to assemble and in 1943 the idea of using older model bombers to guide the others was devised.  The USAAF hoped to ideally assemble bomber formations within an hour.  However this often required two to three hours as planes from multiple airfields required coordination, all under radio silence so as to not tip off the Germans to the impending raid.  The assembly ships had their armaments removed and carried a skeleton crew of two pilots, navigator, radio operator and one or two flare operators.  They were given additional flares, flare ammunition (of a particular color), navigational equipment (including navigational lights) and unique paint schemes. Each paint scheme  was unique and different flare colors carried by each assembly ship in order to more quickly organize the pilots of a particular bomber formation.  Once the bomber formations formed up the assembly ships would link up with other groups before returning to base.  However, there is an instance where a B-24 nicknamed "Spotted Ass Ape" continued with its bomber formation all the way to its target in Germany.  The use of combat boxes and thus assembly ships continued throughout the war even after long-range fighter escorts like the  North American P-51 Mustang and Lockheed P-38 Lightning were put into service.

Recall aircraft
A similarly painted aircraft called a recall aircraft existed at primary training fields in the United States. Due to the fact that PT-17s lacked a radio, an aircraft specially painted with stripes was used to indicate that students should return home if there was bad weather or other another emergency.

See also
 Combat box
 Dazzle camouflage
 Eighth Air Force
 Station hack

References

Military history of the United States during World War II
Aerial warfare tactics
Bomber aircraft